Polish Social Democratic Party of Galicia was a political party in Galicia. The party was formed in 1890 as the Galician territorial organization of the Social Democratic Workers Party of Austria. In 1892 it took the name Social Democratic Party of Galicia (Galicyjska Partia Socjaldemokratyczna or Socjaldemokratyczna Partia Galicji). After an 1907 split, which led to the formation of the Ukrainian Social Democratic Party, the word 'Polish' was added to the party name. It was also known as Polish Social Democratic Party of Galicia and Cieszyn Silesia (Polska Partia Socjalno-Demokratyczna Galicji i Śląska Cieszyńskiego). From 1904 it closely worked with Polish Socialist Party, into which it was merged in 1919.

References

1890 establishments in Austria-Hungary
1919 disestablishments in Poland
Defunct social democratic parties in Poland
Political parties in Austria-Hungary
Political parties disestablished in 1919
Political parties established in 1890
Political parties of the Russian Revolution
Second International